STP-Press is the official news agency of São Tomé and Príncipe.  It is headquartered in the capital city of São Tomé.

History
It was founded in 1985 It is a member of the Aliança das Agências de Informação de Língua Portuguesa (ALP), Alliance of Portuguese-speaking News Agencies, formed in July 1996. and the Atlantic Federation of African News Agencies.

References

External links
Official website, 

News agencies based in São Tomé and Príncipe
1985 establishments in São Tomé and Príncipe